Judo New Zealand (JNZ) is the National Sporting Organisation recognised by the New Zealand Sports Commission for the sport of judo in New Zealand.

History
The body was founded in Auckland in 1952.

Structure
The national body has eight state member associations:

The main tournament they organise is the annual New Zealand National Judo Championships.

References

External links
 

New Zealand
Sports governing bodies in New Zealand
1952 establishments in New Zealand
Sports organizations established in 1952
National members of the International Judo Federation
Judo in New Zealand

https://www.facebook.com/Judowestauckland/